The Total Exclusion Zone (TEZ) was an area declared by the United Kingdom on 30 April 1982 covering a circle of radius  from the centre of the Falkland Islands. During the Falklands War any sea vessel or aircraft from any country entering the zone may have been fired upon without further warning.

Description
A Maritime Exclusion Zone (MEZ) was declared on 12 April 1982 covered a circle of radius  from the centre of the Falkland Islands. Any Argentine warship or naval auxiliary entering the MEZ could have been attacked by British nuclear-powered submarines (SSN).

On 23 April, in a message that was passed via the Swiss Embassy in Buenos Aires to the Argentine government, the British Government clarified that any Argentine ship or aircraft that was considered to pose a threat to British forces anywhere in the South Atlantic would be attacked:

The term civilian aircraft alludes particularly, but not only, to the Boeing 707 of the Argentine Air Force that until then had shadowed the British Task Force on its journey south and had been escorted away on several occasions by Sea Harriers.

The Total Exclusion Zone (TEZ) was an area declared by the United Kingdom on 30 April 1982. It covered the same area as the MEZ. During the Falklands War any sea vessel or aircraft from any country entering the zone may have been fired upon without further warning. This has been described as a "legally questionable exclusion zone", going beyond the well understood in international law Maritime Exclusion Zone, which protects neutral and civilian vessels.

When ARA General Belgrano was sunk on 2 May 1982, it was outside the TEZ. This has led to much debate and controversy over whether the attack was legal. However, exclusion zones are historically declared for the benefit of neutral vessels; during war, under international law, the heading and location of a belligerent naval vessel has no bearing on its status. In addition, the captain of the Belgrano, Héctor Bonzo, has testified that the attack was legitimate (as did the Argentine government in 1994).

Interviews conducted by Martin Middlebrook for his book, The Fight for the "Malvinas", indicated that Argentine Naval officers understood the intent of the message was to indicate that any ships operating near the exclusion zone could be attacked. Argentine Rear-Admiral Allara who was in charge of the task force of which the Belgrano was a part said, "After that message of 23 April, the entire South Atlantic was an operational theatre for both sides. We, as professionals, said it was just too bad that we lost the Belgrano".

On 7 May 1982, the TEZ was extended to within  of the Argentine coast.

References

Falklands War